Sophie Conway (born 6 April 1999) is an Australian rules footballer playing for the Brisbane Lions in the AFL Women's competition (AFLW). 

Conway was raised in Bracken Ridge, Queensland and attended St Rita's College. She was a talented hockey and Australian rules player, making the Under 18 All Australian teams in both sports.

Conway made her debut in the Lions' round 1 game against  at Norwood Oval on 3 February 2018.

Conway's brother Isaac Conway plays for Port Melbourne Football Club in the Victorian Football League (VFL).

References

External links
 

1999 births
Living people
Sportspeople from Brisbane
Sportswomen from Queensland
Australian rules footballers from Queensland
Brisbane Lions (AFLW) players